Cosmin Adrian Mariș (born 6 January 1975) is a Romanian former footballer who played as a forward. In 1997 Mariș and his teammate, Alin Bănceu were transferred together from Universitatea Cluj to Eredivisie team Fortuna Sittard.

References

1975 births
Living people
Romanian footballers
Association football forwards
Liga I players
Liga II players
Eredivisie players
Eerste Divisie players
FC Universitatea Cluj players
Fortuna Sittard players
TOP Oss players
Romanian expatriate footballers
Expatriate footballers in the Netherlands
Romanian expatriate sportspeople in the Netherlands
Sportspeople from Cluj-Napoca